The Government Engineering College Sreekrishnapuram (GEC-S) is a technical education institute established in 1999 in Sreekrishnapuram, Palakkad, Kerala, India. The college is owned by the Government of Kerala and is governed by the Directorate of Technical Education, Kerala. The college is affiliated to the APJ Abdul Kalam Technological University since its inception in 2015.

Campus
The college is located in the town of Sreekrishnapuram in th, Ottapalam taluk of the Palakkad district, Kerala, India. Nearest towns are  Mannarkkad, Cherpulassery, Ottappalam, Shoranur and Palakkad.

The Main building was inaugurated by Kerala Chief Minister V.S Achuthananthan on 1 August 2010.

The institute has six engineering departments: Information Technology, Computer Science Engineering, Mechanical engineering, Electronics and Communication Engineering, Electrical and Electronics Engineering and Civil Engineering.

Organisation and administration

Departments
 Dept. of Electronics and Communications Engineering 
 Dept. of Computer Science and Engineering 
 Dept. of Information Technology 
 Dept. of Electrical Engineering 
 Dept. of Mechanical Engineering 
 Dept. of Civil Engineering 
 Dept. of Mathematics 
 Dept. of Chemistry 
 Dept. of Economics 
 Dept. of Physical education

Facilities
 Central Library
 Computer Center and Seminar Hall
 Gymnasium
 Canteen
 Ladies hostel
 Men's hostel
 Technical Business Incubator
Rain Water Harvesting Plant
New Electrical and Electronics Engineering Department Block

Academics

Courses
The college offers six B.Tech. courses, with an annual intake of 63 regular students and six lateral entry students for each course.

Undergraduate courses:

 Computer Science and Engineering 
 Electronics and Communication Engineering
 Information Technology 
 Mechanical Engineering
 Electrical and Electronics Engineering
 Civil Engineering

Admission to undergraduate courses are based on results in KEAM entrance exam.

Postgraduate courses:
 Computational Linguistics
 Mechanical Engineering (Robotics)

Admission to M.Tech. programmes are based on applicant's result in the GATE conducted by IITs and IISc. Non GATE entries are accepted according to the CGPA in B.Tech.

PhD in department of computer science also started in 2016.

Library
The college library has more than 12,000 volumes that mostly cover the syllabus needs of the students. Some international and national journals are available in the college library. Around 9% of the annual budget is allotted for the Library.

The IEEE Magazine Package is made available in the library.

The library has subscribed to the AICTE-DELNET Scheme for online access to DEL resources of e-journals.

Placements
GECSKP students have been placed in organizations like Microsoft, Accenture, Infosys, Mphasis, Procsys, IBM, TCS, Wipro, Cognizant Technologies, Siemens, HP, Samsung, Patni, CMC Ltd, Future Soft, HCL, IBS, Kirloskar, Huawei Technologies, Canbay Software, Subex, US Technology, DRDO, Cordys, Hexaware, etc.

In 2013–14, more than 50% of students with 7.5 CGPA having no backlogs had been placed.

References

External links
Official website

Engineering colleges in Kerala
Colleges affiliated with the University of Calicut
Universities and colleges in Palakkad district
Educational institutions established in 1999
1999 establishments in Kerala